Human Planet is an 8-part British television documentary series. It is produced by the BBC with co-production from Discovery and BBC Worldwide. It describes the human species and its relationship with the natural world by showing the remarkable ways humans have adapted to life in every environment on Earth. The show drew attention for alleged fakery and the BBC eventually acknowledged that a number of scenes were inaccurately depicted or misleading and withdrew the series from distribution.

Human Planet was originally screened in the UK on BBC One each Thursday at 8pm over eight weeks, starting from 13 January 2011. Domestic repeats have been seen on Eden, with all 8 episodes aired over one week in April 2012. BBC Worldwide has since announced they have sold the broadcast rights to 22 international markets.

Production
Announced in 2007, the production teams based at the BBC Natural History Unit in Bristol and BBC Wales spent three years shooting over 70 stories in some of the most remote locations on Earth spanning about 40 countries. Each episode of the series focuses on a different human-inhabited environment, including deserts, jungles, the Arctic, grasslands, rivers, mountains, oceans, and the urban landscape.

For the first time on a BBC landmark series, the production had a dedicated stills photographer, Timothy Allen, who documented the project photographically for the books and multimedia that accompany the series.

Broadcast

Episodes

Reception
Human Planet was nominated for 7 BAFTA Television Craft awards, the most for any programme in 2011, and it won 2 of them, both for the Arctic episode, where Jason Savage won the factual editing prize, and Will Edwards, Doug Allan and Matt Norman won the photography (cinematography) prize.

Controversy and inaccuracies
The BBC has issued multiple statements about inaccuracies within the series. A first statement admitted that "the portrayal of the [Korowai] tribe moving into the treehouse as a real home is not accurate." In fact, the tribe built the treehouse on commission for the programme. A second statement stated that a scene depicting "a Lamaleran whale hunter named Benjamin Blikololong shown supposedly harpooning a whale" is also inaccurate.

The BBC also later disclosed that a scene from the Deserts episode, which supposedly showed a wild wolf being shot at by Mongolian herders, actually showed a semi-domesticated wolf running to its handler, who was kept out of frame. The wolf was not shot at. Another scene depicting Venezuelan children hunting tarantulas, while implied to be taking place in the jungle, actually was shot in a television studio.

As a result, the BBC withdrew Human Planet from distribution pending a full editorial review.

Merchandise
The Region 2 DVD and Blu-ray three-disc set was released on 21 February 2011.

The Region 1 DVD and Blu-ray three-disc set was released on 26 April 2011.

The Region 4 DVD and Blu-ray three-disc set was released on 5 May 2011.

The accompanying hardcover book was released on 20 January 2011:

References

External links
 
 Human Planet at BBC Earth
 
 Human Planet Audio Slideshow – BBC interview with Human Planet photographer Timothy Allen
 Human Planet web exclusives – Behind the scenes and extra footage
 Human Planet blog
 Timothy Allen's Human Planet photography blog
 Daily Telegraph Review
 Human Planet on Eden

BBC high definition shows
Documentary films about nature
2011 British television series debuts
2011 British television series endings
BBC television documentaries
Discovery Channel original programming
Television series by BBC Studios
Documentary television shows about evolution